Male and Female He Created Them: Toward a Path of Dialogue on the Question of Gender Theory in Education is a document of the Congregation for Catholic Education, published on June 10, 2019, under the prefect Cardinal Giuseppe Versaldi, during the pontificate of Pope Francis, that instructs Catholic schools to teach their students on how to dialogue with others about gender identity.

Summary
The document builds on the apostolic exhortation Amoris laetitia (On Love in the Family), where Pope Francis says, "No one can think that the weakening of the family as that natural society founded on marriage will prove beneficial to society as a whole." It rejects the idea that transgender people can be any gender beside what they are born as. Further it argues that allowing gender norms to change destabilizes the family and society, and that "gender theory" is contrary to the Catholic faith. The document also claims only men and women are sexually compatible with each other.

Responses
The document was welcomed by the United States Conference of Catholic Bishops as clarity on the issue of gender identity. Some transgender Catholics have condemned the document as transphobia. Cindy Bourgeois, minister of Wesley United Church in Regina, Saskatchewan, said the document "denies the humanity of trans people, summarily dismisses entire academic fields and misrepresents science to fit its desired outcome."

See also

 Catholic theology of the body
 Christianity and transgender people
 Sex and gender roles in the Catholic Church
 Pope Francis and LGBT topics

References

External links
 English text

Catholic theology and doctrine
Documents of the Congregation for Catholic Education
Gender and Catholicism
LGBT and Christianity
Transgender topics and religion